In many civil law countries (e.g.: France, Belgium, Switzerland, Portugal, Italy, Brazil) a contravention is a non-criminal offense, similar to an infraction or civil penalty in common law countries.

France

A  in French criminal law is a minor infraction, as opposed to a délit which is more serious, or a crime which is the most serious.
The fine may also be accompanied by an additional sentence.

Competence
Contraventions and their penalties are determined by the executive organs of the French State, unlike délits and crimes which are determined by the legislative organs (Parliament Senate), as per Article 34 of the French Constitution of 1958.
The executive organs include:
The President of the Republic
The government (Cabinet)
The local government (prefects of regions and departments)
The department and region Councils
The police prefect of Paris
The town Council and Mayor

Penalties
As previously stated the maximum fine for an individual is €3000, and the maximum for a corporation or collectivity is €45,000.

The additional penalties are defined in the Article 131-10 of the Penal Code.
They include:
 Prohibitions (e.g. prohibition of residency in the country (for foreign individuals only), prohibition of civil and family rights)
 Forfeitures (e.g. loss of the French nationality - extremely rare)
 Incapacity (e.g. prohibition to take action on one's own property)
 Retraction of a right (e.g. confiscation of driving licence)
 Obligation to seek treatment (e.g. obligation to prove a medical treatment has been followed)
 Obligation of action (e.g. obligation to reimburse the victims)
 Immobilisation or confiscation of an object (e.g. confiscation of weapons or drugs etc.)
 Confiscation of an animal (previously considered as objects)
 Closure of an establishment
 Obligation to publish the court decision publicly, and since the law n°2004-575 in date of June 21, 2004 obligation to communication the decision to the public by electronic means (internet).

The penalties are determined by the legislative organs: Assemblée Nationale and Sénat, or the government in the cases defined in article 49-3 of the Constitution (attribution of certain legislative rights to the government, in particular cases).
There are 5 classes of contraventions, each having a progressively higher maximum fine.

Brazil
In Brazil, contravention is a sort of penal infraction — not only an administrative offense - which is considered to be less serious than a crime.

Since 1941, Brazilian Law has a dual system which separates penal infractions in two main different acts. They are the Código Penal (Brazilian Penal Code) — describing crimes in general — and the Lei de Contravenções Penais (Penal Contraventions Act) — describing the contraventions.

Contraventions are punished less severely than crimes in Brazilian Law. While crimes may be punished to reclusão (reclusion) or detenção (detention), the only kind of possible imprisonment for contraventions is prisão simples (simple prison), which is never served under closed conditions (only open and semi-closed conditions may be applied). Fines may also be imposed due to contravention sentencing.

In Brazilian Law System, one who is already convicted for a crime is not considered to be recidivist when committing a contravention for the first time, and vice versa.

See also
 Comminatory
 Infraction
 Regulatory offences
 Police Tribunal (France)
 
 

Civil law legal terminology